Max Walter Gülstorff (23 March 1882 – 6 February 1947) was a German actor and stage director.

Biography
Gülstorff was born in Tilsit, East Prussia. He first appeared in 1900 at the Rudolstadt municipal Theater and moved to Cottbus in 1908.

In 1911 Gülstorff went to the Schillertheater Berlin and became a member of the ensemble of Max Reinhardt's Deutsches Theater in 1915. He also acted at the Großes Schauspielhaus and the Volksbühne Berlin. In 1923 Gülstorff moved to Vienna, where he worked as a stage director at the Theater in der Josefstadt.

Gülstorff died in Berlin and was buried at the Lichtenrade cemetery.

Filmography

External links
  
Biography with picture (German)
pictures

1882 births
1947 deaths
20th-century German male actors
German male film actors
German male stage actors
German male silent film actors
People from East Prussia
People from Tilsit